Pollanisus eumetopus is a moth of the family Zygaenidae. It is found along the coast of north-eastern Queensland, Australia.

The length of the forewings is 6–7 mm for males and 5.5–7.5 mm for females. There are probably multiple generations per year.

The larvae feed on Pipturus argenteus.

External links
Australian Faunal Directory
Zygaenid moths of Australia: a revision of the Australian Zygaenidae

Moths of Australia
eumetopus
Moths described in 1926